Tani Ruckle (born 25 June 1962) is a Canadian-born former long-distance runner who represented Australia. She ran her career-best time for the marathon with 2:31:19 for fourth at the 1988 Chicago Marathon. That performance moved her to second on the Australian all-time list behind Lisa Martin, and as of 2018, ranks her 12th. She won a silver medal in the marathon at the 1990 Commonwealth Games. She also finished ninth at the 1988 World 15 km Road Race Championships.

She was born in Vancouver, British Columbia.

Competition record

References

External links

1962 births
Athletes from Vancouver
Canadian female long-distance runners
Australian female long-distance runners
Canadian female marathon runners
Australian female marathon runners
Commonwealth Games silver medallists for Australia
Commonwealth Games medallists in athletics
Athletes (track and field) at the 1990 Commonwealth Games
Athletes (track and field) at the 1994 Commonwealth Games
Living people
Medallists at the 1990 Commonwealth Games